Azim Khan's Tomb (aka Azim Khan) is the tomb of Azim Khan, who was a general of the Mughal Army, located on a small hillock at Anuvrat Marg, Delhi-Gurgaon Road, in Delhi, India. The tomb was commissioned in 17th century. It is built in the typical square shaped structure with a crowned dome coated with plaster and decorated with carvings. After the Mughal period, during the British rule, the tomb was used as a recreational place by British soldiers. The tomb is included into the lists of Indian Monuments of National Importance.

History
There are not enough historic records about the general Azim Khan. He was a general in the Mughal Army, was established by the empire's third emperor, Akbar. He was awarded the title "Akbar" (meaning "magnificent") by Akbar himself.

Gallery

References

External links

 

Images

Satellite picture by Google Maps

Mughal tombs
Mausoleums in Delhi
Monuments of National Importance in Delhi